Daulton John Varsho (born July 2, 1996) is an American professional baseball outfielder and catcher for the Toronto Blue Jays of Major League Baseball (MLB). He made his MLB debut in 2020 with the Arizona Diamondbacks.

Amateur career
Varsho attended Marshfield High School in Marshfield, Wisconsin, graduating in 2014. He enrolled at University of Wisconsin–Milwaukee, and played college baseball for the Milwaukee Panthers. He was named the Horizon League Player of the Year in his sophomore year, 2016, after he batted .381/.447/.610. In 2017 he batted .362/.490/.643.

Professional career

Arizona Diamondbacks
The Arizona Diamondbacks selected Varsho in the second round, with the 68th overall selection, of the 2017 Major League Baseball (MLB) draft. He signed and made his professional debut that same year with the Hillsboro Hops of the Class A-Short Season Northwest League, where he batted .311/.368/.534 with seven home runs, 39 runs batted in (RBIs), and had a .902 on-base plus slugging in 50 games. 

In 2018, Varsho played with the Visalia Rawhide of the Class A-Advanced California League,  where he hit .286/.363/.451 with 11 home runs, 44 RBIs, and 19 stolen bases in 80 games. He was a mid-season All Star.

Varsho spent the 2019 season with the Jackson Generals of the Class AA Southern League. In June, he was named to the 2019 All-Star Futures Game. In August, the Diamondbacks began to play Varsho as a center fielder in addition to catcher. He batted .301/.378/.520 with 18 home runs, 58 RBIs, and 21 stolen bases in 396 at bats. After the season, on October 10, 2019, he was selected for the United States national baseball team in the 2019 WBSC Premier12.

The Diamondbacks promoted Varsho to the major leagues on July 30, 2020. He made his major league debut that night against the Los Angeles Dodgers. He finished the season hitting .188/.287/.366 with 3 home runs and 9 RBIs in 37 games. On August 14, 2021, Varsho caught Tyler Gilbert's no-hitter against the San Diego Padres.

In 2022 he led the majors in percentage of balls pulled (54.5%), and batted .235/.302/.443 with 27 home runs and 74 RBIs. He played 71 games in right field, 54 in center field, 31 at catcher, and 15 at DH.

Toronto Blue Jays
On December 23, 2022, the Diamondbacks traded Varsho to the Toronto Blue Jays in exchange for Lourdes Gurriel Jr. and Gabriel Moreno.

On January 13, 2023, Varsho signed a one-year, $3.05 million contract with the Blue Jays, avoiding salary arbitration.

Personal life
He is the son of former MLB outfielder, manager, and coach Gary Varsho, and is named after Darren Daulton, his father's former teammate.

References

External links

1996 births
Living people
Arizona Diamondbacks players
Arizona League Diamondbacks players
Baseball players from Wisconsin
Hillsboro Hops players
Jackson Generals (Southern League) players
Major League Baseball catchers
Milwaukee Panthers baseball players
People from Clark County, Wisconsin
People from Marshfield, Wisconsin
Salt River Rafters players
United States national baseball team players
Visalia Rawhide players
2019 WBSC Premier12 players
Eau Claire Express players